Palpung Monastery is the name of the congregation of monasteries and centers of the Tai Situpa lineage of the Kagyu school of Tibetan Buddhism as well as the name of the Tai Situ's monastic seat in Babang, Kham (modern Sichuan). Palpung means "glorious union of study and practice". It originated in the 12th century and wielded considerable religious and political influence over the centuries.

The current monastery was founded in 1727 by the 8th Tai Situpa "Situ Panchen" with the great support of the Dharma King of Derge Temba Tsering. It is the seat of four lines of incarnate lamas, the best-known being the Tai Situpa as well as the Jamgon Kongtrul and the Second Beru Khyentse. The temple has historically been associated with the Karmapas: for instance, Rangjung Rigpe Dorje, 16th Karmapa, was enthroned first at Palpung before traveling to his main seat at Tsurphu Monastery in Ü-Tsang.

The 12th Tai Situpa, Pema Tönyö Nyinje, has established a new monastic seat in exile at Palpung Sherabling Monastery in the state of Himachal Pradesh near the city of Baijnath. Palpung Yeshe Rabgyeling Nun Monastery is near the city of Manali in the town Bunthar about 3 hours drive from the Palpung Sherabling Monastery.

History
Palpung Monastery is the historical seat of the successive incarnations of the Chamgon Kenting Tai Situpas in Kham. It is also the mother monastery of the Karma Kagyu in Kham and evolved into the center of the Rimé movement. The seat in exile, outside of Tibet, Sherabling Monastery, is in India. The congregation has monasteries and centers around the world.

Palpung in Tibet

Palpung Monastery is a gompa in Babang Township, Dêgê County, Garzê Tibetan Autonomous Prefecture in western Sichuan. It has historically always been associated with the Karmapas such as the 16th Karmapa being enthroned first at Palpung before traveling to his main seat at Tsurphu Monastery in Ü-Tsang. The Karmapas and Tai Situpas have been connected closely over time, alternating as master and disciple.

Palpung originated in the 12th century and wielded considerable religious influence over the centuries. Palpung Monastery was founded by the 8th Tai Situpa "Situ Panchen" in 1727 and developed into one of the most prestigious centers in Tibetan history.

The monastery once hosted more than 1000 monks and had one of the most leading monastic universities of the area. It is the seat of various lines of incarnate lamas, the best known being the Tai Situpa and the Jamgon Kongtrul.

Palpung was known for its huge library with more than 324,000 texts and an art collection of more than 10,150 thangkas. It was also leading in the fields of spiritual painting and the Situ Rinpoche is the founder of Karma Gadri painting style. At the time of the 11th Tai Situ Rinpoche, Palpung was already famous for spiritual, studious and artistic excellence and authority.

The monastery was partially destroyed in the late 1950s during the Cultural Revolution. The construction efforts by the 12th Tai Situpa has been in progress. In 1998-1999 it was added to the list of worldwide endangered list of monuments

There are an estimated 800 monks residing in the monastery itself and a larger number resident in the surrounding region.

Palpung in India

Pema Tönyö Nyinje, the 12th Tai Situpa, fled from Kham to Bhutan and then India at the age of six, where he consequently received his formal traditional training under Rangjung Rigpe Dorje, 16th Karmapa. At the age of 22 he started to set up his seat in exile, Palpung Sherabling Monastery, in Himachal Pradesh, North India.

Palpung Sherabling Monastery currently has approximately 1,000 monks; 250 are enrolled in the monastic university curriculum on the premises. Palpung Yeshe Rabgyeling Nun Monastery is located near the city of Manali, in the Bunthar town has about 200 nuns. The Monastery also offers the traditional Kagyu three-year retreat for both monks and nuns on the compound.

Palpung Congregation
The Palpung congregation consists of more than 180 monasteries and temples throughout some Chinese and Tibetan districts. Palpung Congregation also has branch institutions in Europe, USA, Canada Oceania and Asia altogether about 300 branches world wide. Its European Seat is Palpung Yeshe Chökhor Ling Europe, Palpung Europe which was established and is under the direction of Chöje Lama Palmo.

See also
Tibetan Buddhism

References

Sources
A brief introduction to Palpung
Palpung Yeshe Chökhor Ling Europe: Palpung congregation
Palpung Architecture Project

External links
Palpung Congregation
Palpung Europe
Palpung Congregation
Palpung Architecture Project
Palpung Congregation
Palpung Ireland

Tibetan Buddhist temples in the Garzê Tibetan Autonomous Prefecture
Tibetan Buddhist temples
Karma Kagyu monasteries and temples
Buddhist monasteries in Sichuan
Garzê Tibetan Autonomous Prefecture